The U-Men was an American rock band, formed in Seattle, Washington, in 1980 and active until 1989. They toured extensively across the United States. Their musically "dirty" sound and off-the-wall sense of humor were a forerunner for the later grunge bands to come out of Seattle.

History

The U-Men were fronted by vocalist John Bigley and included Tom Price, Charlie "Chaz" Ryan, Robin Buchan, Jim Tillman, Tom Hazelmyer and later Tony "Tone Deaf" Ransom. Their alternative rock sound was credited by Allmusic for helping to inspire the Seattle grunge sound.

In 1983, The U-Men became the first band managed by renowned Seattle band manager Susan Silver.

Butthole Surfers named the song "The O-Men", from the album Locust Abortion Technician, in their honor. 

Tom Price moved on to form Gas Huffer, and also play in The Monkeywrench. Bigley and Ryan co-founded The Crows. Jim Tillman, who is recognized as the main line-up bass player having played on the first two full releases which included the self-titled EP, "The U-Men" (1984), "Stop Spinning" (1985), and the Deep Six compilation (1986) track "They", went on to play bass for other local bands, most notably Love Battery. Mark Arm from Mudhoney noted on Sub Pop's anthology release announcement that the band was never the same after Tillman's departure. 

Tom Hazelmyer briefly played with the band  but left to remain in his hometown of Minneapolis (performing live just once with the band when they opened for Big Black at the Showbox Theater in March 1987) to promote his record company (Amphetamine Reptile Records) and band, Halo of Flies.

Band members
John Bigley – vocals
Tom Price – guitar
Robin Buchan – bass (1980–1982)
Jim Tillman – bass (1982–1986)
Charlie Ryan – drums

Additional bassists include:
Tom Hazelmyer – bass (1987)
Tony Ransom – bass (July 1987 – 1989)

Discography

Albums
Step on a Bug (Black Label Records, 1988)

Singles and EPs
U-Men EP (Bomb Shelter Records, 1984)
Stop Spinning EP (Homestead Records, 1985)
"Solid Action" b/w "Dig It A Hole" (Black Label Records, 1987)
"Freezebomb" b/w "That's Wild About Jack" (Amphetamine Reptile, 1988)
Sugar Daddy Live Split Series Vol. 1 (Amphetamine Reptile, 2012; split with the Melvins)

Compilation albums
Solid Action (Chuckie-Boy Records, 1999)
U-Men (Self-titled anthology, Sub Pop, 2017)

Compilation and soundtrack contributions
"Blue Christmas" on the Christmas '84 compilation
"They" on the Deep Six compilation (C/Z Records, 1986)
"Shoot 'Em Down (live)" on the Woodshock '85 compilation (El Jefe Records, 1986)
"Gila" on the Sub Pop 100 compilation (Sub Pop Records, 1986)
"Bad Little Woman" on the Dope-Guns-'N-Fucking In The Streets, Vol. 1 compilation (Amphetamine Reptile, 1988)
"Bad Little Woman" on the Dope-Guns-'N-Fucking In The Streets, Vols. 1-3 compilation (Amphetamine Reptile, 1989)
"Dig It a Hole" on the Hype! soundtrack (Sub Pop Records, 1996)

References

Further reading

External links
[ The U-Men @ AllMusic.com]

Garage rock groups from Washington (state)
Indie rock musical groups from Washington (state)
Garage punk groups
Homestead Records artists
Musical groups from Seattle
Musical groups established in 1981
Musical groups disestablished in 1989
Amphetamine Reptile Records artists